HVA may refer to:

 Hardin Valley Academy, in Knoxville, Tennessee
 Harlem Village Academies, in Harlem, New York
 Hauptverwaltung Aufklärung, the defunct foreign intelligence service of the German Democratic Republic
 Helmand Valley Authority, Afghanistan
 Historic Vehicle Association, a large North American historic vehicle owners’ organization
 Hogeschool van Amsterdam, a Dutch educational institution
 Homovanillic acid, a major catecholamine metabolite
 Husqvarna Motorcycles, now a subsidiary of BMW, a motorcycle manufacturer